William Domvile (1686 – November 1763) was an Anglo-Irish politician.

Domvile was the Member of Parliament for Dublin County in the Irish House of Commons between 1717 and 1727.

References

1686 births
1763 deaths
17th-century Anglo-Irish people
18th-century Anglo-Irish people
William
Irish MPs 1715–1727
Members of the Parliament of Ireland (pre-1801) for County Dublin constituencies